A city with powiat rights is in Poland a designation denoting 66 of the 107 cities (the urban gminas which are governed by a city mayor or prezydent miasta) which exercise also the powers and duties of a county, thus being an independent city. Sometimes, such a city will also be referred to in Polish as city county; this term however is not official (it was used during the interwar times of the Second Polish Republic). The contemporary term city with powiat rights should not be used interchangeably with the interwar city county.

Such cities are distinct from and independent of the 314 regular powiats (sometimes referred as 'land counties', again a term that was used in the interwar period and is not used in modern Polish law).

List of cities with powiat rights

References

See also 
 Consolidated city-county